Socialist Party is the name of many different political parties around the world. All of these parties claim to uphold some form of socialism, though they may have very different interpretations of what "socialism" means. Statistically, most of these parties advocate either democratic socialism, social democracy or even Third Way as their ideological position. Many Socialist Parties have explicit connections to the labor movement and trade unions. See also Socialist International, list of democratic socialist parties and organizations and list of social democratic parties. Parties belonging to the pan-Arabist Ba'ath movement describe themselves as socialist parties. A number of affiliates of the Trotskyist International Socialist Alternative also use the name "Socialist Party".

This list only includes parties that use the exact name "Socialist Party" for themselves, sometimes alongside the name of the country in which they operate. The list does not include political parties that use the word "Socialist" in addition to one or more other political adjectives in their names. For example, the numerous parties using the name "Socialist Workers' Party" are not included.

Active parties

Former parties 
These are parties which no longer exist or have changed their name from "Socialist Party".

See also 
 Communist party
 Democratic Socialist Party (disambiguation)
 List of Labour Parties
 Lists of political parties
 List of social democratic parties
 Social Democratic Party
 Socialist Equality Party (United States)
 Socialist International
 Socialist Labor Party (disambiguation)
 Socialist People's Party (disambiguation)
 Socialist Workers Party (disambiguation)